The Girl Problem is a 1919 American drama film directed by Kenneth S. Webb, and starring Corinne Griffith. It is considered a lost film.

Plot

Cast
Corinne Griffith as Erminie Foster
Agnes Ayres as Helen Reeves
Walter McGrail as Ernest Sanford
William David as Monte Ralston 
Julia Swayne Gordon as Mrs. Reeves
Eulalie Jensen as Aunt Julia
Frank Kingsley as Eric Jordan
Harold Foshay as Hasbrook

References

External links

1916 films
1916 lost films
American silent feature films
Films with screenplays by Joseph F. Poland
1910s American films